Joy Williams (born February 11, 1944) is an American novelist, short-story writer, and essayist. Her notable works of fiction include State of Grace, The Changeling, and Harrow. Williams has received a Guggenheim Fellowship for Creative Arts, a Rea Award for the Short Story, a Kirkus Award for Fiction, and a Library of Congress Prize for American Fiction.

Early life and education
Williams was born in Chelmsford, Massachusetts. She grew up in Maine and was an only child. Her father was a Congregational minister with a church in Portland, Maine, and her grandfather was a Welsh Baptist minister.

She received a BA from Marietta College and a MFA from the University of Iowa. At Iowa, Williams studied alongside Raymond Carver, R.V. Cassill, Vance Bourjaily, and Richard Yates. After graduating from Iowa, she married and moved to Florida, where she had a dog, a beach, and a Jaguar XK150, and wrote her first novel, State of Grace.

Williams has taught creative writing at the University of Houston, the University of Florida, the University of Iowa, and the University of Arizona. For the 2008-09 academic year, Williams was the writer-in-residence at the University of Wyoming, and she continued thereafter as an affiliated faculty member of the English department. She lives in Key West, Florida, and Tucson, Arizona.

Williams was married for 34 years to L. Rust Hills, fiction editor for Esquire, until his death on August 12, 2008.

Work

Williams is the author of five novels. Her first, State of Grace (1973), was nominated for a National Book Award for Fiction. Her book The Quick and the Dead (2002) was a finalist for the Pulitzer Prize for Fiction. Her first collection of short stories, Taking Care, was published in 1982. A second collection, Escapes, followed in 1990. A 2001 essay collection, Ill Nature: Rants and Reflections on Humanity and Other Animals, was a finalist for the National Book Critics Circle Award for Criticism. Honored Guest, a collection of short stories, was published in 2004. A 30th anniversary reprint of The Changeling was issued in 2008 with an introduction by the American novelist Rick Moody. The book was also republished in 2018 to celebrate 40 years from its original publication. Her most recent novel, Harrow, was published in September 2021.

Williams's stories and essays are frequently anthologized, and she has received many awards and honors, including the Harold and Mildred Strauss Living Award from the American Academy of Arts and Letters and the Rea Award for the Short Story. In 2008, she was elected as a member of the American Academy of Arts and Letters. In 2021, she received the Library of Congress Prize for American Fiction.

Williams's fiction often portrays life as a downward spiral, addressing various forms of failure in America from spiritual, ecological, and economic perspectives. Her characters, generally from the middle class, frequently fall from it, at times in bizarre fashion, in a form of cultural dispossession. Williams's adult characters are usually divorced, her children are abandoned, and their lives are consumed with fear, often irrational, such as the little girl in the story "The Excursion", who is terrified that birds will fly out of her toilet bowl. The critic Rosellen Brown has characterized the figures in Williams's work as seeming to be "born spiritually on the lam, living their clammy lives in a watery, vegetation-laden, untended-feeling place ... in ineffective shade." Critics have also said her work has elements of both minimalism and the Gothic.

In an introductory note in 1995's edition of Best American Short Stories, Williams wrote: "All art is about nothingness: our apprehension of it, our fear of it, its approach."

Williams is especially noted for her writing on the environment. In addition to her work Ill Nature, she is the author of a guidebook to the Florida Keys, which Condé Nast called "one of the best guidebooks ever written" and "a magnificent, tragicomic guide."

Published work

Novels
State of Grace (1973)
The Changeling (1978)
Breaking and Entering (1988)
The Quick and the Dead (2000)
 Harrow (2021)

Story collections
Taking Care (1982)
Escapes (1990)
Honored Guest (2004)
99 Stories of God (2013)
The Visiting Privilege: New and Collected Stories (2015)

Nonfiction
 Ill Nature: Rants and Reflections on Humanity and Other Animals (essays) (2001)
 The Florida Keys: A History & Guide, illustrated by Robert Carawan (Tenth Edition) (2003)

Selected stories

Notes

References
 The Writer's Almanac: Saturday, 11 February 2006 by Garrison Keillor. The Writer's Almanac from American Public Media (February 2006). Retrieved on 2007 April 12.
 "Joy Williams, Winner 1999" [press release], undated. www.ReaAward.org Retrieved on 2015 August 8.
 Bradley, Jane. Blanche H. Gelfant Editor. Lawrence Graver Assistant Editor. The Columbia Companion to the Twentieth-Century American Short Story. New York: Columbia University Press, 2001.
 Brown, Rosellen. “Rosellen Brown Discovers Joy Williams.” The Women's Review of Books, vol. 16, no. 10/11, 1999, pp. 33–33. 
 Szalay, Edina. “BREAKING INTO THE HOUSE OF DEATH AND LOVE : THE GOTHIC AS SUBTEXT IN A MINIMALIST NOVEL (JOY WILLIAMS' ‘BREAKING & ENTERING’).” Hungarian Journal of English and American Studies (HJEAS), vol. 4, no. 1/2, 1998, pp. 285–298. www.jstor.org/stable/41274011.
 Thompson, James R. "Carolyn Chute and Joy Williams: Alternate Voices of Rage and Curious Dismay," in Constructing the Eighties: Versions of an American Decade, eds. Walter Grunzweig, Roberta Maierhofer, & Adolf Wimmer.  Tübingen: Gunter Narr Verlag, 1992.

External links
 New York Times Magazine profile (2015) "The Misanthropic Genius of Joy Williams"
 The Art Of Fiction interview (2014)

1944 births
Living people
20th-century American novelists
21st-century American novelists
American women short story writers
American women novelists
Iowa Writers' Workshop alumni
Iowa Writers' Workshop faculty
People from Chelmsford, Massachusetts
University of Arizona faculty
University of Iowa faculty
University of Florida faculty
University of Iowa alumni
American women essayists
20th-century American women writers
21st-century American women writers
20th-century American short story writers
21st-century American short story writers
20th-century American essayists
21st-century American essayists
PEN/Malamud Award winners
Novelists from Florida
Novelists from Arizona
Novelists from Iowa
American women academics
Kirkus Prize winners
Members of the American Academy of Arts and Letters